William Smith Ingham House is a historic house in Meridian, Cayuga County, New York. Built in 1835, it is a two-story, three bay, side hall frame house in a vernacular Greek Revival style. A late 19th-century carriage house is also on the property.

It was listed on the National Register of Historic Places in 2005.

It has a Temple-style front with a tetrastyle portico of Ionic columns. It is located at 3069 W Main St. (NY-370) in Meridian.

References

External links

Houses on the National Register of Historic Places in New York (state)
Houses completed in 1835
Houses in Cayuga County, New York
National Register of Historic Places in Cayuga County, New York
Greek Revival architecture in New York (state)